The Jonson Gallery is a historic building on the campus of the University of New Mexico in Albuquerque, New Mexico, which was completed in 1950 as a combination home and gallery for the modernist painter Raymond Jonson. During Jonson's lifetime and afterwards, the gallery was a center for modern and abstract art in New Mexico, as well as housing a large collection of Jonson's own works. In 2009, the gallery's collections were absorbed into the University of New Mexico Art Museum and the former gallery building was converted to office space.

The Jonson Gallery is a relatively sparse Pueblo Revival style building designed by John Gaw Meem, who also designed several other buildings on the university campus. It sits on a hillside with one story above grade in the front and two in the back. The front elevation consists of a main horizontal volume, with a centered front entrance flanked by asymmetrical windows, and a lower wing projecting to the west. Steel casement windows with concrete sills are used throughout. The upper floor housed Jonson's residence, while the gallery space was on the lower floor. Multiple additions were constructed at the rear of the building over the years.

References

New Mexico State Register of Cultural Properties
National Register of Historic Places in Albuquerque, New Mexico
Art museums and galleries in New Mexico
University of New Mexico
Residential buildings in Albuquerque, New Mexico
Residential buildings on the National Register of Historic Places in New Mexico
University and college buildings on the National Register of Historic Places in New Mexico
Museums in Albuquerque, New Mexico
Art museums established in 1950
Pueblo Revival architecture in Albuquerque, New Mexico